Telekom may refer to:

A1 Telekom Austria Group, Austria
A1 Telekom Austria
Deutsche Telekom, Germany
Hrvatski Telekom, Croatia
Magyar Telekom, Hungary
Crnogorski Telekom, Montenegro
Makedonski Telekom, North Macedonia
Telekom Romania, Romania
Slovak Telekom, Slovakia
Telekom Malaysia, Malaysia
Telekom Srbija, Serbia
Telekom Srpske, Bosnia and Herzegovina
Telekom Slovenije, Slovenia
Türk Telekom, Turkey

See also
Telecom (disambiguation)